Manduca boliviana is a moth of the  family Sphingidae. It is known from Bolivia.

The length of the forewings is about 44 mm. It is similar to Manduca scutata and Manduca brasiliensis, but smaller, much lighter coloured and the forewings are shorter and more rounded than the latter. The forewing upperside ground colour is light grey and the forewing underside is light, with three strongly marked postmedian bands and a broad marginal band. The hindwing upperside has a white submarginal band and the hindwing underside postmedian band is narrower and more marked than in Manduca scutata and Manduca brasiliensis.

References

Manduca
Moths described in 1923